Hughenden  is a rural town and locality in the Flinders Shire, Queensland, Australia.

Geography 
Hughenden is situated on the banks of the Flinders River.

Hughenden has the following mountains (from west to east):

 Mount Walker 
 Mount Mowbray 
 Mount Devlin 
 Mount Castor 
 Mount Beckford 

The region around Hughenden is a major centre for the grazing of sheep and cattle. The main feed is annual grasses known as Flinders grass, which grow rapidly on the (by Australian standards) fertile grey or brown cracking clay soils after rain between November and March.

The runoff from the Flinders River is much too erratic to provide a sustainable supply for any crop-growing via irrigation.

Hughenden is on the Great Northern railway line with a number of railway stops in the locality (from west to east):

 Ballindalloch railway station, now abandoned
Hughenden West railway station, now abandoned (.
Hughenden railway station, serving the town
Hughenden East railway station, now abandoned
Pooroga railway station, now abandoned
Hughenden was a terminus for the former Hughenden-Winton railway line with the following rail stops in the locality (north to south):

 Dividing Siding railway siding point, now abandoned.
 Watten railway station, now abandoned.
Hughenden Airport is to the north-east of the town.

History
The upper Flinders River area has been occupied by the Yirandhali people from around 11,000 years ago. Jirandali (also known as Yirandali, Warungu, Yirandhali) is an Australian Aboriginal language of North-West Queensland, particularly the Hughenden area. The language region includes the local government area of the Shire of Flinders, including Dutton River, Flinders River, Mount Sturgeon, Caledonia, Richmond, Corfield, Winton, Torrens, Tower Hill, Landsborough Creek, Lammermoor Station, Hughenden, and Tangorin.

Dalleburra (also known as Dalebura, Dal-leyburra, Yirandali) is a language of North-West Queensland, particularly Lammermoor Station via Hughenden. The Dalleburra language region includes the local government boundaries of the Flinders Shire Council.

The region in the vicinity of Hughenden was originally known as Mokana in the Yirandhali language.

British occupation began in October 1861 with the expedition group led by Frederick Walker camping near the site of the future township of Hughenden. Pastoralists soon followed and in 1863 Ernest Henry and his cousin Robert Gray established the Hughenden sheep station. Hughenden was named after Hughenden Manor in Buckinghamshire, England, the home of former British Prime Minister Benjamin Disraeli. Robert Gray and Ernest Henry both had a family connection with Hughenden Manor. Mary Francis Norris, the daughter of John Norris of Hughenden Manor was Henry's mother and Robert's aunt.

The actual town of Hughenden began in 1870 as a barracks for the paramilitary Native Police with sub-Inspector Harry Finch and his six troopers constructing the simple buildings at the junction of Station Creek with the Flinders River. In 1877, William Mark built a pub near the barracks and in August of that year the township site was officially surveyed and allotments made available for purchase.

Hughenden Post Office opened on 1 July 1878 (a receiving office had been open from 1874).

Hughenden Provisional School opened on 22 April 1880, becoming Hughenden State School in 1884. On 30 January 1968, it was expanded to have a secondary department.

In November 1883, "Hughenden West Estate" made up of 37 allotments were advertised to be auctioned by Wilson, Ayton and Ryan of Townsville. A map advertising the auction states the allotments are charmingly situated on high sloping ground, overlooking the Town of Hughenden, within a few minutes walk to the Post and Telegraph Offices, the Court House and the business centre of town. The map also states these residence sites only need the completion of the railway works to enormously increase its value.

Hughenden North Provisional School opened , becoming Hughenden North State School on 1 January 1909. Due to low attendances, it closed in 1926.

St Francis' Catholic School was opened on 1 October 1900 by the Sisters of the Good Samaritan.

Torrens Creek near Hughenden is where the Americans stored explosives in World War II. The Americans didn't know of the dangerous bush fires out there. After they put out a fire they went back to camp thinking that the fire was out. However, the fire took hold again without them knowing. They then heard about twelve major explosions in succession; the explosions left craters twenty feet deep. Hot shrapnel covered a wide area and started more fires. In the townships, people said that buildings shook and windows broke, and some people were convinced that an air raid had occurred. Thousands of soldiers and civilians attacked the blaze in an attempt to stop it spreading to fuel dumps, but were unable to control it. When the fire got to the explosives it was so powerful it blew the Americans out of their trucks. Many buildings and shops got burnt down from the spreading fires. However the locals were able to save the post office. A police Constable from Torrens Creek Police was awarded the King's Medal of Bravery.

In June 1945 it was announced that a new court house would be built in Hughenden in the 1945-1946 financial year with architectural plans drawn up in August 1945. However, it was not until September 1946 that the Executive Council of the Queensland Government approved expenditure of £31,560 for the project. In September 1947, the project stopped because it was determined that the foundations would not support a 2-storey building and that the new court house would have to be redesigned as single-level building. In January 1950, the new plans for the one-storey building were announced and by October that year, the construction was progressing in "leaps and bounds". A shortage of cement appears to have delayed the project until 10,000 tons of cement was imported from England in January 1951. By January 1952, three-quarters of the framing had been completed while the project was suffering from a shortage of skilled labour and the cost having risen to an estimated £60,000. In October 1954 the court house was described as "almost completed", but it was not until 1955 that the court house opened.

In 1960, the Hughenden branch of the Queensland Country Women's Association opened their hall.

On 9 June 2003 in the Queen's Birthday Honours List, Mrs Jean Eva Anderson of Ballater Station of Stamford was awarded the Medal of the Order of Australia for her "service to the community of Hughenden, particularly through the Country Womens Association". She had given 52 years of service to the Hughenden branch of the Queensland Country Women's Association. Her award was presented to her by the Governor of Queensland, Quentin Bryce.

In August 2008, Hughenden hosted the first Arid Lands Festival and The Great Hughenden Camel Endurance Challenge.

Heritage listings
Hughenden has a number of heritage-listed sites, including:
 25 Gray Street: The Grand Hotel

Education
Hughenden State School is a government primary and secondary (Prep-12) school for boys and girls at 12 Moran Street. In 2018, the school had an enrolment of 115 students with 15 teachers and 13 non-teaching staff (11 full-time equivalent).

St Francis Catholic School is a Catholic primary (Prep-6) school for boys and girls at 8 Flinders Street. In 2018, the school had an enrolment of 41 students with 4 teachers and 4 non-teaching staff (3 full-time equivalent).

Media 
Hughenden is served by five radio stations.

Amenities
Hughenden has a visitor information centre, showground, shire hall, and racecourse.

The Flinders Shire Council operates the Flinders Shire Public Library at 39 Grey Street.

The Hughenden branch of the Queensland Country Women's Association has its rooms at 42 Stansfield Street.

Hughenden has a large range of sports on offer, including pony clubs, swimming, lawn bowls, golf, netball, tennis, campdrafting, rugby league, and gymnastics. The Hughenden Hawks are the local Rugby League team.

Events
The town hosts the Hughenden Dinosaur Festival, which attracts tourists and includes entertainment and other events.

Other annual events include the Hughenden Show, held the first weekend in June; the Hughenden Country Music Festival, held every Easter week end and the Bullride and Race Day which is held in September. The Matron's Ball is also a popular annual event.

The Hughenden Rugby 7's is a popular one day Rugby Union Carnival, run in the town since 2012.

Attractions 
Hughenden has a replica of the Muttaburrasaurus, a dinosaur, whose bones were discovered in 1963 near Muttaburra ( by road from Hughenden) and some teeth and other bones were also discovered around Hughenden. One reason for fossils being discovered must be the dry climate, which means the rocks are usually bare of vegetation.

The Historic Coolabah Tree is a tourist attraction. Two expeditions searching for the lost Burke and Wills expedition left blazes on the tree.. The search expeditions were led by Frederick Walker in 1861 and William Landsborough in 1862.

Transport
 Hughenden Airport

Climate
Hughenden has a hot semi-arid climate (Köppen BSh). On average, a minimum below  is recorded once per year.

Variability is extreme, however, and totals as high as  occur roughly one year in ten, whilst in the driest years as little as  can be recorded.

Humidity is generally low except when the monsoon is active, when relatively lower temperatures accompany high humidity. The same applies to cloudiness: in the dry winter months over twenty days are completely clear.

See also
 Porcupine Gorge National Park
 Kennedy Energy Park

References

Further reading 
 The Railways of Hughenden Knowles, J.W. Australian Railway Historical Society Bulletin, April, 1965

External links 

University of Queensland: Queensland Places: Hughenden
Town map of Hughenden, 1979, northern and southern sections
Hughenden Court House Discover Queensland Buildings website

Towns in Queensland
North West Queensland
Shire of Flinders (Queensland)
Queensland in World War II
Localities in Queensland